Pavle "Pavo" Jurina (2 January 1954 – 2 December 2011) was a Croatian handball player who competed in the 1980 Summer Olympics and in the 1984 Summer Olympics.

Jurina was born in Našice. Standing at 1.94 m, he debuted as a handball player with the local team RK NEXE Našice; in 1976 he moved to RK Partizan Bjelovar, winning the Yugoslav national championship in 1977 and 1979. In 1980 he was a member of the Yugoslav handball team which finished sixth in the handball Olympic tournament. He played all six matches and scored 33 goals. Jurina was elected three times as best Yugoslav player

Four years later he was part of the Yugoslav team which won the gold medal in the Los Angeles Summer Olympics. He played all six matches and scored five goals. In 1984 he moved to Italy, where he played at Gaeta. In 1986/1987 Jurian played for German team TuS Schutterwald. Later he coached several Italian teams, including Gaeta, Città Sant'Angelo, Sassari and Alcamo.

He died in 2011 from a cardiac arrest.

References

External links
Profile at Olympic Players database website
Profile at sportal.hr

Croatian male handball players
Olympic gold medalists for Yugoslavia
Olympic medalists in handball
People from Našice
1954 births
2011 deaths
Yugoslav male handball players
Handball players at the 1980 Summer Olympics
Handball players at the 1984 Summer Olympics
Olympic handball players of Yugoslavia
Medalists at the 1984 Summer Olympics
Croatian handball coaches